The 1916–17 SK Rapid Wien season was the 19th season in club history.

Squad

Squad and statistics

Squad statistics

Fixtures and results

League

References

1916-17 Rapid Wien Season
Rapid
Austrian football championship-winning seasons